Arquivos do Museu Nacional (previously Archivos do Museu Nacional; ISSN: 0365–4508) is the oldest scientific journal of Brazil. Its first issue was published in 1876, founded by Ladislau de Souza Mello Netto. The journal is edited and published quarterly (March, June, September and December) by the National Museum of Brazil and the Federal University of Rio de Janeiro. The journal areas cover anthropology, archaeology, botany, geology, paleontology and zoology.

References

External links

1876 establishments in Brazil
Publications established in 1876
Portuguese-language journals
Quarterly journals
Anthropology journals
Archaeology journals
Botany journals
Geology journals
Paleontology journals
Zoology journals
National Museum of Brazil
Academic journals published by museums
Academic journals of Brazil